Anthela varia, the variable anthelid, is a moth of the family Anthelidae. The species was first described by Francis Walker in 1855. It is found in the coastal areas of southern Western Australia, southern Queensland, New South Wales, and Victoria.

The wingspan can range up to 90 mm for females.

The larvae, commonly called the hairy mary caterpillar, feeds on Macadamia integrifolia, Eucalyptus, Grevillea and Stenocarpus species.

References

Moths described in 1855
Anthelidae